Refat Mustafaev (1911  1984) was a Crimean Tatar communist who served as a regional party secretary and battalion commissar in the Crimean resistance during World War II. After the Nazi troops were forced out of Crimea he was still subject to deportation to Kokand in the Surgun, forcing him to live away from him homeland of Crimea for the rest of his life because of his Crimean Tatar nationality. He was an activist for the right of return from the early days of the Crimean Tatar civil rights movement.

References

Crimean partisans
1984 deaths
Commissars
People from Taurida Governorate
Crimean Tatar people